Concord is a town in Middlesex County, Massachusetts, in the United States. At the 2020 census, the town population was 18,491. The United States Census Bureau considers Concord part of Greater Boston. The town center is near where the confluence of the Sudbury and Assabet rivers forms the Concord River.

The area that became the town of Concord was originally known as Musketaquid, an Algonquian word for "grassy plain." Concord was established in 1635 by a group of English settlers; by 1775, the population had grown to 1,400. As dissension between colonists in North America and the British crown intensified, 700 troops were sent to confiscate militia ordnance stored at Concord on April 19, 1775. The ensuing conflict, the battles of Lexington and Concord, were the incidents (including the shot heard round the world) that triggered the American Revolutionary War.

A rich literary community developed in Concord during the mid-19th century, centered around Ralph Waldo Emerson. Emerson's circle included Nathaniel Hawthorne, Louisa May Alcott and Henry David Thoreau. Major works written in Concord during this period include Alcott's novel Little Women, Emerson's essay Self-Reliance, and Thoreau's Walden and Civil Disobedience. In this era, the now-ubiquitous Concord grape was developed in Concord by Ephraim Wales Bull.

In the 20th century, Concord developed into an affluent Boston suburb and tourist destination, drawing visitors to the Old North Bridge, Orchard House and Walden Pond. The town retains its literary culture and is home to notable authors, including Doris Kearns Goodwin, Alan Lightman and Gregory Maguire. Concord is also notable for its progressive and environmentalist politics, becoming in 2012 the first community in the United States to ban single-serving PET bottles.

History

Prehistory and founding

The area which became the town of Concord was originally known as "Musketaquid", situated at the confluence of the Sudbury and Assabet rivers. The name was an Algonquian word for "grassy plain", fitting the area's low-lying marshes and kettle holes. Native Americans had cultivated corn crops there; the rivers were rich with fish and the land was lush and arable. The area was largely depopulated by the smallpox plague that swept across the Americas after Europeans arrived.

In 1635, a group of English settlers led by Rev. Peter Bulkeley and Major Simon Willard received a land grant from the General Court and negotiated a land purchase with the local indigenous tribes. Bulkeley was an influential religious leader who "carried a good number of planters with him into the woods"; Willard was a canny trader who spoke the Algonquian language and had gained the trust of Native Americans. They exchanged wampum, hatchets, knives, cloth, and other useful items for the six-square-mile purchase from Squaw Sachem of Mistick, which formed the basis of the new town, called "Concord" in appreciation of the peaceful acquisition.

Battle of Lexington and Concord

The Battle of Lexington and Concord was the first conflict in the American Revolutionary War. On April 19, 1775, a force of British Army regulars marched from Boston to Concord to capture a cache of arms that was reportedly stored in the town. Forewarned by Samuel Prescott (who had received the news from Paul Revere), the colonists mustered in opposition. Following an early-morning skirmish at Lexington, where the first shots of the battle were fired, the British expedition under the command of Lt. Col. Francis Smith advanced to Concord. There, colonists from Concord and surrounding towns (notably a highly drilled company from Acton led by Isaac Davis) repulsed a British detachment at the Old North Bridge and forced the British troops to retreat. Subsequently, militia arriving from across the region harried the British troops on their return to Boston, culminating in the siege of Boston and the outbreak of the war.

The colonists initially publicized the battle as an example of British brutality and aggression; one colonial broadside decried the "Bloody Butchery by the British Troops". But a century later, the conflict was remembered proudly by Americans, taking on a patriotic, almost mythic status ("the shot heard 'round the world") in works like the "Concord Hymn" and "Paul Revere's Ride". In 1894, the Lexington Historical Society petitioned the Massachusetts State Legislature to proclaim April 19 "Lexington Day". Concord countered with "Concord Day". Governor Greenhalge opted for a compromise: Patriots' Day. In April 1975, Concord hosted a bicentennial celebration of the battle, featuring an address at the Old North Bridge by President Gerald Ford.

Literary history

Concord has a remarkably rich literary history centered in the 19th century around Ralph Waldo Emerson (1803–1882), who moved there in 1835 and quickly became its most prominent citizen. A successful lecturer and philosopher, Emerson had deep roots in the town: his father, Rev. William Emerson (1769–1811), grew up in Concord before becoming an eminent Boston minister, and his grandfather, William Emerson Sr., witnessed the battle at the North Bridge from his house, and later became a chaplain in the Continental Army. Emerson was at the center of a group of like-minded Transcendentalists living in Concord. Among them were the author Nathaniel Hawthorne (1804–1864) and the philosopher Amos Bronson Alcott (1799–1888), the father of Louisa May Alcott (1832–1888). A native Concordian, Henry David Thoreau (1817–1862) was another notable member of Emerson's circle. This substantial collection of literary talent in one small town led Henry James to dub Concord "the biggest little place in America."

Among the products of this intellectually stimulating environment were Emerson's many essays, including Self-Reliance (1841), Louisa May Alcott's novel Little Women (1868), and Hawthorne's story collection Mosses from an Old Manse (1846). Thoreau famously lived in a small cabin near Walden Pond, where he wrote Walden (1854). After being imprisoned in the Concord jail for refusing to pay taxes in political protest against slavery and the Mexican–American War, Thoreau penned the influential essay "Resistance to Civil Government", popularly known as Civil Disobedience (1849). Evidencing their strong political beliefs through actions, Thoreau and many of his neighbors served as station masters and agents on the Underground Railroad. 

The Wayside, a house on Lexington Road, has been home to a number of authors. It was occupied by scientist John Winthrop (1714–1779) when Harvard College was temporarily moved to Concord during the Revolutionary War. The Wayside was later the home of the Alcott family (who referred to it as "Hillside"); the Alcotts sold it to Hawthorne in 1852, and the family moved into the adjacent Orchard House in 1858. Hawthorne dubbed the house "The Wayside" and lived there until his death. The house was purchased in 1883 by Boston publisher Daniel Lothrop and his wife, Harriett, who wrote the Five Little Peppers series and other children's books under the pen name Margaret Sidney. Today, The Wayside and the Orchard House are both museums. Emerson, Thoreau, Hawthorne, and the Alcotts are buried on Authors' Ridge in Concord's Sleepy Hollow Cemetery.

The 20th-century composer Charles Ives wrote his Concord Sonata as a series of impressionistic portraits of literary figures associated with the town. Concord maintains a lively literary culture to this day; notable authors who have called the town home in recent years include Doris Kearns Goodwin, Alan Lightman, Robert B. Parker, and Gregory Maguire.

Concord grape
In 1849, Ephraim Bull developed the now-ubiquitous Concord grape at his home on Lexington Road, where the original vine still grows. Welch's, the first company to sell grape juice, maintains a headquarters in Concord. The Boston-born Bull developed the Concord grape by experimenting with seeds from some of the native species. On his farm outside Concord, down the road from the Emerson, Thoreau, Hawthorne and Alcott homesteads, he planted some 22,000 seedlings before producing the ideal grape. Early ripening, to escape the killing northern frosts, but with a rich, full-bodied flavor, the hardy Concord grape thrives where European cuttings had failed to survive. In 1853, Bull felt ready to put the first bunches of Concord grapes before the public and won a prize at the Boston Horticultural Society Exhibition. From these early arbors, the fame of Bull's ("the father of the Concord grape") Concord grape spread worldwide, bringing him up to $1,000 a cutting, but he died a relatively poor man. The inscription on his tombstone reads, "He sowed—others reaped."

Plastic bottle ban
On September 5, 2012, Concord became the first community in the United States to approve a ban of the sale of water in single-serving plastic bottles. The ban provoked significant national controversy. An editorial in the Los Angeles Times characterized the ban as "born of convoluted reasoning" and "wrongheaded." Some residents believed the ban would do little to affect the sales of bottled water, which was still highly accessible in the surrounding areas, and that it restricted consumers' freedom of choice. Opponents also considered the ban to unfairly target one product in particular, when other, less healthy alternatives such as soda and fruit juice were still readily available in bottled form. Nonetheless, subsequent efforts to repeal the ban have failed in open town meetings. An effort to repeal Concord's ban on the sale of plastic water bottles was resoundingly defeated at a Town Meeting. Resident Jean Hill, who led the initial fight for the ban, said, "I really feel at the age of 86 that I've really accomplished something." Town Moderator Eric Van Loon didn't even bother taking an official tally because opposition to repeal was so overwhelming. It appeared that upwards of 80 to 90 percent of the 1,127 voters in attendance raised their ballots against the repeal measure. The issue had been bubbling in Concord for several years. In 2010, a ban approved in a town meeting, which wasn't written as a bylaw, was rejected by the state attorney general's office. In 2011, a new version of the ban narrowly failed at town meeting by a vote of 265 to 272. The ban on selling water in polyethylene terephthalate (PET) bottles of one liter or less passed in 2012 by a vote of 403 to 364, and a repeal effort in April failed by a vote of 621 to 687.

Geography

Massachusetts state routes 2, 2A, 62, 126, 119, 111, and 117 pass through Concord. The town center is near the confluence of the Sudbury and Assabet rivers, forming the Concord River, which flows north to the Merrimack River in Lowell. Gunpowder was manufactured from 1835 to 1940 in the American Powder Mills complex extending upstream along the Assabet River.

Government

Local government consists of a five-member executive Select Board and a legislature utilizing open town meeting.

State and federal government
On the federal level, Concord is part of Massachusetts's 3rd congressional district, represented by Lori Trahan. The state's senior (Class I) member of the United States Senate is Elizabeth Warren. The junior (Class II) senator is Ed Markey.

Demographics

At the 2000 census, there were 16,993 people, 5,948 households and 4,437 families residing in the town. The racial makeup of the town was 91.64% White, 2.24% African American, 0.09% Native American, 2.90% Asian, 0.02% Pacific Islander, 2.12% from other races, and 0.99% from two or more races. Hispanic or Latino of any race were 2.80% of the population.

There were 13,090 households, of which 37.2% had children under the age of 18 living with them, 65.5% were married couples living together, 7.2% had a female householder with no husband present, and 25.4% were non-families. 22.0% of all households were made up of individuals, and 10.4% had someone living alone who was 65 years of age or older. The average household size was 2.62 and the average family size was 3.08.

25.1% of the population were under the age of 18, 4.2% from 18 to 24, 25.8% from 25 to 44, 28.4% from 45 to 64, and 16.5% who were 65 years of age or older. The median age was 42 years. For every 100 females, there were 100.3 males. For every 100 females age 18 and over, there were 101.8 males.

In 2017, the median household income was $155,393. About 2.1% of families and 3.9% of the population were below the poverty line, including 3.7% of those under age 18 and 3.3% of those age 65 or over.

Pronunciation 

Economy

Principal employers
According to Concord's 2016 Comprehensive Annual Financial Report, the principal employers in the town are:

Transportation

Concord and West Concord stations are served by the MBTA's Fitchburg Line. Yankee Line provides commuter bus service between Concord and Boston.

Sister cities
Concord's sister cities are:
Nanae, Japan
Saint-Mandé, France

Points of interest

 Barrett's Farm
 Reuben Brown House, home of notable revolutionist
 Concord Art Association
 Concord Free Public Library
 Concord Museum
 Concord Scout House, popular venue for contra dancing and other events
 Concord's Colonial Inn
 Corinthian Lodge
 Egg Rock, where the Concord River forms at the confluence of the Sudbury and Assabet rivers, accessible by water or land
 Emerson Hospital
 Ralph Waldo Emerson House
 Estabrook Woods
 Fairyland Pond
 First Parish in Concord
 Great Meadows National Wildlife Refuge
 Massachusetts Correctional Institution – Concord
 Minute Man National Historical Park
The Minute Man statue
 Northeastern Correctional Center
 The Old Manse, home of Emerson and Hawthorne
 Old North Bridge
 Orchard House
 Punkatasset Hill
 Sleepy Hollow Cemetery 
 Walden Pond
 The Wayside, home of Louisa May Alcott, Hawthorne, and Margaret Sidney
 Wheeler-Minot Farmhouse, also known as Thoreau Farm, birthplace of Henry David Thoreau
 Wright's Tavern

Education
 Concord-Carlisle Regional High School, the local public high school
 Concord Middle School (consisting of two buildings about a mile apart: Sanborn and Peabody)
 Alcott School, Willard School, and Thoreau School, the local public elementary schools
 Concord Academy and Middlesex School, private preparatory schools
 The Fenn School is a 4-9 boys' school.
 The Nashoba Brooks School is co-ed PK-3 and a girls' school 4-8.

Notable people

In popular culture
Concord is featured in the 2012 video game Assassin's Creed 3, and the 2015 video game Fallout 4. The video game Walden, a game, based on Henry David Thoreau's Walden, is set in the town.

Scenes from the 2017 comedy film Daddy's Home 2 were shot at Concord scout house. Parts of the 2019 film Little Women were shot on the Concord River.

Jane Langton's Homer Kelly murder mystery novels are largely set in Concord. Her 1964 novel 'The Transcendental Murder' was described in the Boston Globe in 1975 as 'a hymn to Concord, its history, its houses, its hallowed ground, its people and patriots, and its ghosts (Emerson and Thoreau)'.

The Mother-Daughter Book Club series of children's novels is set in Concord.

See also
 National Register of Historic Places listings in Concord, Massachusetts
 Concord, Vermont – name linked to Concord, Massachusetts
 Concord, Ontario – named for a settler who arrived from Concord, Vermont
 USS Concord, 5 ships

References

Further reading
1871 Atlas of Massachusetts. by Wall & Gray.  Map of Massachusetts. Map of Middlesex County.
 History of Middlesex County, Massachusetts, Volume 1 (A–H),  Volume 2 (L–W) compiled by Samuel Adams Drake, published 1879–1880. 572 and 505 pages.  Concord article by Rev. Grindall Reynolds in volume 1, pages 380–405.
 Rorabaugh, William J. "Who Fought for the North in the Civil War? Concord, Massachusetts, Enlistments," Journal of American History 73 (December 1986): 695–701 online

External links

 Town of Concord official website

 
1635 establishments in Massachusetts
Populated places established in 1635
Populated places on the Underground Railroad
Towns in Massachusetts
Towns in Middlesex County, Massachusetts
Transcendentalism